James Alexander Grimsley Jr. (November 14, 1921 – June 11, 2013), was a United States Army Major General and combat veteran of two wars who also served as President of his alma mater, The Citadel from 1980 to 1989.

Life and career
Grimsley was born and raised in Florence, South Carolina. After graduating with The Citadel, class of 1942, he was commissioned as a Second Lieutenant in the US Army and immediately went to the Pacific Theater to fight in World War II. He held numerous high leadership positions including command of an infantry brigade in Vietnam, a tour as Assistant Commander of the 2d Armored Division and service on the Army General Staff. His career culminated with an assignment as a Deputy Assistant Secretary of Defense. After 33 years of service, Grimsley retired from the active duty in 1975.

Grimsley came to The Citadel in 1975 as Vice President for Administration and Finance; he was named President in 1980 upon the resignation of his predecessor, Vice Admiral James B. Stockdale. His tenure at the Citadel was marked by a return to traditional values in the corps of cadets, a significant increase in applications, major physical improvements to the campus and rising academic rankings.

When Grimsley retired in 1989, he was named President Emeritus.  This distinction had previously only been given to General Charles Summerall and General Mark Clark.

Awards
During Grimsley's active duty career, he received 35 major decorations, including the following:

References

1921 births
2013 deaths
People from Florence, South Carolina
Recipients of the Legion of Merit
Recipients of the Silver Star
The Citadel, The Military College of South Carolina alumni
The Citadel, The Military College of South Carolina staff
United States Army generals
Recipients of the Air Medal
Recipients of the Distinguished Service Medal (US Army)
Presidents of The Citadel, The Military College of South Carolina
United States Army personnel of World War II